This is a list of the 2014 Championship 1 season results. Championship 1 is the third-tier rugby league competition in the United Kingdom. The 2014 season starts on 2 March with the Grand Final at Leigh Sports Village in Leigh, Greater Manchester.

The 2014 season consists of two stages. The regular season was played over 18 round-robin fixtures, in which each of the nine teams involved in the competition played each other once at home and once away. This means that teams will play 16 games and will have two bye-rounds, where they will not play a game. In the Championship 1, a win was worth three points in the table, a draw worth two points apiece, and a loss by less than 12 points during the game earned one bonus point. Defeats by more than 12 points yielded no points.

At the end of the regular season, due to restructuring the teams who finish the regular season between first and fifth will enter the play-offs with the winner claiming promotion.

Regular season

Round 1

Round 2

Round 3

Round 4

Round 5

Round 6

Round 7

Round 8

Round 9

Round 10

Round 11

Round 12

Round 13

Round 14

Round 15

Round 16

Round 17

Round 18

Round 19

Round 20

Round 21

Round 22

Round 23

Round 24

Playoffs

Week 1

Week 2

Week 3

Week 4

Play-off ladder

2014 in English rugby league
2014 in Welsh rugby league
RFL League 1